Lerkehaug is a village area in the municipality of Steinkjer in Trøndelag county, Norway. Although it's located just south of the main part of the town, it has been considered a part of the town of Steinkjer since 2002.

References

Villages in Trøndelag
Steinkjer